Peñarroya is the name of several places:

 Peñarroya de Tastavins, a town in Aragón, Spain
 Peñarroya-Pueblonuevo, a town in Andalusia, Spain
Peñarroya CF, a Peñarroya-Pueblonuevo football team
 Peñarroya (peak), a 2,019 m high mountain peak in the Sistema Ibérico